Smothered and Covered is a collection of outtakes, demos and rarities by The Handsome Family. It was released in 2003 by Handsome Family Music.

Track listing
"There's A City" - 3:12
outtake from In the Air
"Sunday Morning Coming Down" - 4:48
Kris Kristofferson cover
"Prepared Piano #1" - 1:29
acoustic piece played by Brett Sparks on a modified piano
"I Hear A Sweet Voice Calling" - 3:44
Bill Monroe cover
"Down In The Ground" - 2:30
4-track demo of the song released on Through the Trees
"Cello #1" - 1:00
acoustic piece played by Brett Sparks on cello
"Trail Of Time" - 3:12
Alton Delmore cover	
"Far Away Eyes" - 4:26
Rolling Stones cover
"Knoxville Girl" - 4:03
version of a traditional
"Prepared Piano #2" - 1:04
acoustic piece played by Brett Sparks on a modified piano
"The Last" - 2:45
4-track demo of the song released on Odessa
"Banks Of The Ohio" - 3:26
version of a traditional
"Cello #2" - 1:15
acoustic piece played by Brett Sparks on cello
"Natalie Wood" - 3:43
outtake from Twilight
"#1 Country Song" - 3:35
demo of the song released on Milk and Scissors
"Prepared Piano #3" - 0:45
acoustic piece played by Brett Sparks on a modified piano
"Stupid Bells" - 2:59
4-track song recorded in 1993 on cassette
"The Weinermobile" - 0:59
song by Brett Sparks

References

External links
The Handsome Family official website

The Handsome Family albums
2003 compilation albums